The Norwegian Sámi Association, also known as NSR, is the largest Sámi organization in Norway. The association was founded in 1968.

Purpose
The NSR actively runs cultural, social, and informational work through local groups and Sámi associations. In total, 24 Sámi associations are attached to the NSR.  The NSR is also active politically, running for elections in Sametinget (the Sámi Parliament of Norway) and sending delegates to the Sámi Council.

The NSR was founded in 1968, so it has been contributing to the development of Sámi society and culture since before the Sámi Parliament was established. The NSR goal is to unite the Sámi people across different special interests. As such, the NSR is independent of any outside political parties or religions.

Since the establishment of the Sámi Parliament in 1989, the NSR has held the leadership and presidency of the organization. The Sámi Parliament presidents have been Ole Henrik Magga from Kautokeino (1989–1997), Sven-Roald Nystø from Tysfjord (1997–2005), and Aili Keskitalo from Kautokeino (2005–2007, 2013–2016 and 2017–2021).

Presidents
The following table lists the presidents of the NSR since its founding.

References

External links 
 Norwegian Sámi Association 

Sámi associations
Saami Council
Sámi in Norway
Indigenous rights organizations in Europe
Indigenous organisations in Norway